Saroleh or Sarelah or Sarlah may refer to:
 Sarlah, Hamadan
 Saroleh, Khuzestan
 Saroleh Rural District, in Khuzestan Province